Whitesnake's Greatest Hits is a compilation of Whitesnake's biggest hits from the 1980s. It features hit singles from their albums Slide It In, Whitesnake and Slip of the Tongue. The album also contains three tracks previously unavailable in the USA.

Commercial performance
The compilation charted at number 4 on the UK Albums Chart and at number 161 on the US Billboard 200. The album was certified Platinum (1,000,000 sold) in the U.S. in September 1998 and gold in the UK.

The single "Is This Love" was reissued to promote Whitesnake's Greatest Hits, and featured the song "Sweet Lady Luck" (a B-side from the previous album Slip of the Tongue). This version reached number 25 on the UK Singles Chart.

Track listing

Greatest Hits: Revisted, Remixed, Remastered (2022)

CD and Blu-ray Track listing

Charts

Album

Singles

Certifications

References

Whitesnake compilation albums
1994 greatest hits albums
Geffen Records compilation albums
EMI Records compilation albums